Carlo Tenca (19 October 1816, Milan - 4 September 1883, Milan) was an Italian man of letters, journalist, deputy and supporter of the Risorgimento.  He was the central figure in the salon of Countess Clara Maffei, to whom he was romantically linked.

References

1816 births
1883 deaths
Journalists from Milan
Italian people of the Italian unification
Italian male journalists
19th-century Italian journalists
19th-century Italian male writers
Deputies of Legislature XI of the Kingdom of Italy
Deputies of Legislature XII of the Kingdom of Italy
Deputies of Legislature XIII of the Kingdom of Italy